John David Brewer HDSSc, MRIA, FRSE, FAcSS, FRSA (born 1951) is an Irish-British sociologist who was the former President of the British Sociological Association (2009–12), and has been the Professor of Post Conflict Studies in the Senator George J. Mitchell Institute for Global Peace, Security and Justice at Queen's University Belfast (2013–present), Honorary Professor Extraordinary, Stellenbosch University (2017–present) and Honorary Professor of Sociology, Warwick University (2021–present). He was formerly Sixth-Century Professor of Sociology at the University of Aberdeen (2004–13). He is a member of the United Nations Roster of Global Experts for his work on peace processes (2010–present). He was awarded an honorary doctorate in 2012 from Brunel University for services to social science.

Background
Born in Ludlow, Shropshire, England, in 1951, he lived in nearby Cleobury Mortimer until he went to university. He was Head Boy at Lacon Childe School in Cleobury Mortimer and won the British Sugar Corporation Prize for his A-Levels at Kidderminster College of Further Education. He played football and cricket for Shropshire schoolboys. He has taught in numerous universities in the UK, United States and Australia. He is the author and co-author of sixteen books, the editor or co-editor of a further six, as well as a contributor to numerous publications.

Academic work
Brewer was educated at the Universities of Nottingham and Birmingham. He was Professor of Sociology, and former Head of Department of Sociology (2004–2007), at Aberdeen University, moving from Queen's University, Belfast in July 2004, to which he returned in 2013 as its first Professor of Post Conflict Studies. He was Head of the School of Sociology and Social Policy at Queen's between 1993 and 2002. Brewer taught at the University of East Anglia before moving to Queen's in 1981. He has held visiting appointments at Yale University (1989), St John's College, Oxford (1992), Corpus Christi College, Cambridge (2002) and the Research School of Social Sciences at the Australian National University (2003). He was awarded a Leverhulme Trust Research Fellowship in 2007–2008.

Brewer is a Fellow of the Royal Society of Arts (elected 1998), a Fellow of the Academy of Social Sciences (elected 2003), a Member of the Royal Irish Academy (elected 2004), then only the third sociologist to be elected in the Academy's 217-year history, and a Fellow of the Royal Society of Edinburgh (elected 2008).

He has been Chair of the British Sociological Association (2004–2006), President (2009–2012), a member of the National Committee for Economics and Social Science of the Royal Irish Academy (1997–1999), and a Board Member of the ESRC's Training and Development Board (2005–2007). Brewer has been a member of the International Assessment Panel of the Irish Research Council for the Humanities and Social Sciences (2002–2007), and sat on its Governing Council (2008–12). He was also a member of the ESRC's Virtual Research College (2005–10). He sat on the Governing Council of the Irish Research Council (2012–15) and the Academy of Social Sciences in the UK (2012–15). In 2001, he became a member of the Institute of Learning and Teaching in Higher Education. In 2010 he was appointed to the United Nations' Roster of Global Experts for his expertise on peacebuilding.

Writings
Brewer is author and co-author of sixteen books including, Inside the RUC (Clarendon Press, Oxford); After Soweto (Clarendon Press, Oxford); Black and Blue (Clarendon Press, Oxford); Crime in Ireland 1945-95 (Clarendon Press, Oxford); Police, Public Order and the State (Macmillan; now in its 2nd edition); Anti-Catholicism in Northern Ireland 1600-1998 (Macmillan); Ethnography (Open University Press); C. Wright Mills and the Ending of Violence (Palgrave); Peace Processes: A Sociological Approach (Polity Press); Religion, Civil Society and Peace in Northern Ireland (Oxford University Press); Ex-Combatants, Religion and Peace in Northern Ireland (Palgrave); The Public Value of the Social Sciences (Bloomsbury); and The Sociology of Everyday Life Peacebuilding (Palgrave). He is also editor of Can South Africa Survive and Restructuring South Africa, both with Macmillan, and co-editor of The Sociology of Compromise after Conflict (Palgrave); Public Value (Routledge) and the A-Z of Social Research with Sage. Brewer has over 30 contributions in edited collections and 40 peer reviewed articles in journals such as British Journal of Sociology (seven times); Sociology (five times); Sociological Review (three times); Ethnic and Racial Studies (three times); as well as contributions to Archives Europeennes de Sociologie; Human Studies; History of Human Sciences; American Behavioral Scientist; Sociology of Health and Illness; International Journal of Comparative Sociology; and Sociolinguistics and African Affairs (three times); amongst others. In total, he has earned grant income to the value of £6.4 million. Most recently he was awarded £1.26 million from the Leverhulme Trust to undertake a five-year study of compromise amongst victims of communal conflict.

Brewer is Series Editor for the Palgrave Studies in Compromise after Conflict Book Series and Co-Editor of the Bristol University Press Book Series on Public Sociology

Brewer publishes in the following areas: crime and policing; religion and ethno-religious conflict; the sociology of the Bible; peace processes and post-violence adjustments; qualitative research methodology; especially ethnography; Adam Ferguson and the Scottish Enlightenment; and, interpretative sociological theory.

Selected publications

References

https://web.archive.org/web/20110916213717/http://www.abdn.ac.uk/socsci/staff/details.php?id=j.brewer

1951 births
Living people
Writers from Ludlow
Fellows of the Academy of Social Sciences
Academics of Queen's University Belfast
Academics of the University of Aberdeen
Academics of the University of East Anglia
Alumni of the University of Birmingham
Alumni of the University of Nottingham
British sociologists
Fellows of the Royal Society of Edinburgh
Members of the Royal Irish Academy
Presidents of the British Sociological Association